Taekwondo competitions at the 2008 Summer Olympics in Beijing were held from August 20 to August 23. The tournament was held at the Beijing Science and Technology University Gymnasium. There were four weight categories for both men and women. Each NOC can enter 2 men and 2 women, but only 1 athlete per weight category. There was one global Olympic Qualification Tournament and one qualification tournament for each continent. In addition, 4 invitational places were awarded.

Timeline

Qualification summary

Men's events

−58 kg

−68 kg

−80 kg

+80 kg

Women's events

−49 kg

−57 kg

−67 kg

+67 kg

References

External links
 World Taekwondo Federation

Qualification for the 2008 Summer Olympics
2008